This is a list of the heritage sites in the North West province of South Africa, as recognized by the South African Heritage Resources Agency.

|}

References 

Tourist attractions in North West (South African province)
North West
Heritage sites